Charles Nicholson (1808–1903) was a British-Australian politician, first speaker of the New South Wales Legislative Council.

Charles Nicholson may also refer to:
Charles Nicholson (flautist) (1795–1837), English flautist and composer
Charles Edward Nicholson (1854–1931), Australian politician
Sir Charles Norris Nicholson (1857–1918), British Liberal politician, MP for Doncaster, 1906–1918
Sir Charles Nicholson, 2nd Baronet (1867–1949), his son, architect
Charles Ernest Nicholson (1868–1954), British yacht designer at Camper and Nicholsons
Charles G. Nicholson (1919–2003), former Republican member of the Pennsylvania House of Representatives
Charles Christian Nicholson, 3rd Baronet (born 1941), British peer